Stoyko Georgiev Tsonov (born 6 May 1969) is a retired Bulgarian triple jumper.

He was born in Boretz. He competed at the 1996 Olympic Games, but finished lowly. His personal best jump was 17.02 metres, achieved in 1995.

He has later coached triple jumpers such as Ivaylo Rusenov. His son, Georgi Tsonov, is also a triple jumper.

References

1969 births
Living people
Bulgarian male triple jumpers
Athletes (track and field) at the 1996 Summer Olympics
Olympic athletes of Bulgaria
Bulgarian athletics coaches